Brachyscome graminea, commonly known as grass daisy, is a  perennial herb in the family Asteraceae and is endemic to Australia. It has mostly mauve-pink or purple daisy-like flowers and a yellow centre.

Description
Brachyscome graminea  is a perennial herb with slender stems rising from the base of the plant or upper leaves. The leaf edges entire, sometimes fleshy, smooth or with scattered hairs. The flower petals are 8–10 mm (0.31–0.39 in) long, white or mauve, flower head  in diameter  and the centre yellow. The 15-20 overlapping flower bracts are narrowly elliptic, green, barely toothed and rounded at the tip. Flowering occurs from October to May.

Taxonomy and naming
Brachyscome graminea was first formally described in 1858 by Ferdinand Von Mueller and the description was published in  Fragmenta Phytographiae Australiae  The specific epithet (graminea) is a Latin word meaning "grassy" or "of grass".

Distribution and habitat
In New South Wales grass daisy is a widespread species growing in coastal districts in wet locations, cliff edges and at higher altitudes in freshwater swamps and streams.
In Victoria it grows widespread over much of the State in salt laden coastal marshes in the Glenelg River area to Mallacoota. At higher altitudes in freshwater swamps and streams near  Benambra and Omeo.

References

graminea
Flora of New South Wales
Flora of Tasmania
Taxa named by Jacques Labillardière